Federal Route 55 or Jalan Kuala Kubu Bharu–Teranum–Raub (also called Jalan Pahang in Kuala Kubu Bharu) is a 62-km federal road connecting the states of Selangor and Pahang in Malaysia. It is the first federal road ever constructed in Pahang. The road connects Kuala Kubu Bharu, Selangor to Teranum near Raub in Pahang where it meets Federal Route 218. It is the main access route to Fraser's Hill.

Route background
The Kilometre Zero of the Federal Route 55 is located at Kuala Kubu Bharu, Selangor, at its intersection with the Federal Route 1, the main trunk road of the central of Peninsular Malaysia. After passing Kuala Kubu Bharu town centre, it runs along the eastern circumference of the Selangor Dam. Shortly after passing the Selangor Dam, the road becomes winding as it ascends the Titiwangsa Range until its intersection with the uphill road to Fraser's Hill at The Gap on the Selangor–Pahang state border. 

Then, the road descends downhill, running in parallel with the Teranum River until Teranum where it intersects with Malaysia Federal Route 218. 

As the road winds through mountainous terrain, it is often prone to landslides which result in partial or total closures of the section between Kuala Kubu Bharu and Teranum.

History

First East-West Road
Built in the 1887, Federal Route 55 is the earliest federal road to be constructed in Pahang and the first road over the Titiwangsa Range or Main Range through the pass at The Gap, linking the West Coast of Peninsula Malaysia with the East Coast. It was constructed as an 80-mile bridle track from Kuala Kubu Bharu to Kuala Lipis known as the Kuala Kubu–Kuala Lipis Road. In 1915, a road was constructed from Teranum to Bentong, forming the southern pioneer route for the Federal Route 8. 

In 1919, work started on the access road to the hill station from The Gap and by 1922, the hill station named Fraser's Hill was opened to visitors. The road is now designated as Federal Route 56.

The entire roadway was upgraded and paved in 1928 with the specific cost of RM2,004 per mile (or RM1,237 per kilometre), which was considered as the most expensive road project at that time.

During the Malayan Emergency, Sir Henry Gurney, a British High Commissioner in Malaya, was assassinated by the Malayan Communist Party terrorists at Mile 56 ½, Kuala Kubu Road on 7 October 1951, on his way to Fraser's Hill. The communist terrorists ambushed his Rolls-Royce Silver Wraith and shot him to death. His remains were buried at the Cheras Road Christian Cemetery (now Cheras War Cemetery) at Jalan Cheras, Kuala Lumpur. A memorial signboard was later erected by Malaysian Public Works Department at the site of the incident (location: 3.673596,101.747346 ).

The portion of the Kuala Kubu–Kuala Lipis Road from Teranum to Raub, together with the road from Teranum to Bentong, became part of Federal Route 8 before they were bypassed by a new, straighter super two road through FELDA Lurah Bilut. There after, the bypassed old road between Bentong and Raub including the section between Teranum and Raub was re-gazetted to become the new Federal Route 218.

At the end of the 1990s, a new water dam known as the Sungai Selangor Dam was constructed to cater to the increasing water demand in the Klang Valley. During construction, a 7.7-km super two road was built to replace the existing roadway at the Sungai Selangor Dam construction site. Construction started in 2001 and was completed in 2003. This road has two bridges, the Sungai Selangor bridge and the Sungai Peretak bridge.

List of junctions and towns 

* Note: The Pahang-Selangor border runs along the Titiwangsa drainage divide to the east of the archway then proceeds along the middle of the road before proceeding up the hill slope from the point between sentry hut and the road to Teranum at The Gap-Fraser's Hill Road junction.

Gallery

References

Malaysian Federal Roads